Matthew James Calibjo Hartmann (born 19 August 1989), also known as Matt Hartmann, is a former Filipino profoessional footballer who played as a central midfielder. He represented the Philippines at international level.

Career

Club career 
Hartmann went through the ranks at Portsmouth until he was released at the end of the 2006–07 season. In his final year with Portsmouth, he went out on loan to Weymouth eventually making a total of four appearances for the club.

In July 2007, Nottingham Forest signed Hartmann on a free transfer joining as a third year academy member. By July 2008 he was released and signed for Bognor Regis Town on a free transfer and made five appearances for the club.

In early September 2011, Hartmann signed for Filipino side Loyola Agila, thus joining his two brothers who already play for the club.

On 24 April 2015, Global announced that Hartmann has signed with them and will join his brother Mark Hartmann who was already with the club.

On 1 March 2019, Hartmann signed for English non-League football club Gosport Borough.

International career 
Hartmann received his first senior call-up in November 2006 for the 2007 ASEAN Football Championship qualification tournament in Bacolod. He made his debut in the opening match as the Philippines lost 2–1. It would be his only appearance in the tournament. Early the following year, he got a call-up to play for the Philippine U-21's in the Hassanal Bolkiah Trophy. He made two appearances, against Myanmar and Brunei.

In September 2011, he was back in the national team setup and was named in the final 20-man squad for the 2011 Long Teng Cup and the provisional Philippines under-23 squad for the 2011 Southeast Games. In the Long Teng Cup, he made his first senior appearance since his debut in November 2006, playing the full 90 minutes in the 3–3 draw against Hong Kong in the opening match.

He was selected as a captain of the national under-23 team in time for the 2011 Southeast Asian Games.

Personal life 
He is the younger brother of Darren Hartmann, who has played for the Philippine U-21's during the 2005 Hassanal Bolkiah Trophy and the older brother of Mark Hartmann, who is also a Philippines under-23 and senior international footballer.

Honours 
PFF National Men's Club Championship: - 2014- 2015 Best midfielder. 
PFF National Men's Club Championship: - 2014- 2015 Most valuable player
United Football League: - 2016 Best midfielder

References

External links 

1989 births
Living people
Footballers from Southampton
English footballers
Citizens of the Philippines through descent
Filipino footballers
Filipino expatriate footballers
Philippines international footballers
Association football fullbacks
Association football midfielders
Portsmouth F.C. players
Weymouth F.C. players
Nottingham Forest F.C. players
Bognor Regis Town F.C. players
F.C. Meralco Manila players
Global Makati F.C. players
National League (English football) players
Davao Aguilas F.C. players
Gosport Borough F.C. players
British Asian footballers
English people of German descent
English people of Filipino descent
Filipino people of German descent
Filipino people of English descent
Filipino British sportspeople
Wessex Football League players